This is a list of CBBC programmes that are currently and formerly being broadcast on the children's television strand of the BBC in the United Kingdom.

Current programming

Live action

 4 O'Clock Club (2012–2020)
 All Over the Place (2011–present)
 Almost Never (2019–present)
 Andy and the Band (2020–present)
 Art Ninja (2015–present)
 Big Fat Like (2020–present)
 Blue Peter (1958–present)
 Class Dismissed (2016–present)
 Clipheads (2022–present)
 Crackerjack! (1955–1984, 2020–present)
 Danny and Mick (2019–present)
 Deadly 60 (2009–2012, 2020–present)
 Dodger (2022-present)
 Dwight in Shining Armor (2021–present)
 First Day (2020–present)
 Game on Grandparents (2022–present)
 Got What It Takes? (2016–present)
 Hardball (2021–present)
 Heirs of the Night (2020–present)
 Hey You What If? (2020–present)
 Holly Hobbie (2019–present)
 Horrible Histories (2009–2013, 2015–present)
 Itch (2020–present) 
 Jamie Johnson (2016–present)
 Junior Eurovision Song Contest (2022–present)
 Lagging (2021–present)
 Lifebabble (2016-2017)
 Love! Love! Love! (2022–present) 
 Malory Towers (2020–present)
 Matilda and the Ramsay Bunch (2015–present)
 Mimi and Co (2020–present)
 Monster Court (2021–present)
 My Life (2011–present)
 My Perfect Landing (2020–present)
 Mystic (2020–present)
 Newsround (1972–present)
 Nova Jones (2021–present)
 Odd Squad (2015–present)
 One Zoo Three (2020–present)
 Operation Ouch! (2012–present)
 Our CBBC (2021–present)
 Our School (2014–present)
 Out of This World (2020–present)
 Princess Mirror-Belle (2021–present)
 Saturday Mash-Up! (2017–present)
 Seriously Raleigh (2021–present)
 Show Me The Honey (2021–present)
 Show Me What You're Made Of (2011–present)
 Silverpoint (2022–present)
 Sketchy Comedy (2018)
 Snaps (2021–present)
 So Awkward (2015-present)
 The Amelia Gething Complex (2019–present)
 The Beaker Girls (2021–present)
 The Demon Headmaster (1996–1998, 2019–present)
 The Dengineers (2015–present)
 The Dog Ate My Homework (2014–present)
 The Dumping Ground (2013–present)
 The New Legends of Monkey (2021–present)
 The Next Step (2014–present)
 The Pets Factor (2017–present)
 The Playlist (2017–present)
 The Story of Tracy Beaker (2002–present)
 The Zoo (2017–present)
 Theodosia (TV series) (2022–present)
 Top Class (2016–present)
 What's Cooking Omari (2020–present)
 Wow That's Amazing (2022–present)

Animation
 Arthur (1997-present) (reruns on CBeebies)
 Boy Girl Dog Cat Mouse Cheese (2019–present)
 Danger Mouse (2015–present)
 The Deep (2016–present)
 Dennis & Gnasher: Unleashed! (2017–present)
 Dragon Ball Super (2022–present) (iPlayer only)
 Dragon Quest: Dai no Daiboken (2021) (2022–present) (iPlayer only)
 DreamWorks Dragons: The Nine Realms (2022–present)
 Monster Loving Maniacs (2022-present)
 Ninja Express (2021–present)
 OOglies (2009–2015)
 Oswaldo (2022–present)
 Pokémon (2022–present)
 Pokémon the Series: Diamond and Pearl (2022–present)
 Pokémon the Series: Black & White (2022–present) (iPlayer only)
 Pokémon the Series: Sun & Moon (2022–present) 
 Ronja, the Robber's Daughter (2022–present)
 Scream Street (2015-present)
 Shaun the Sheep (2007–present)
 Summer Camp Island (2021–present)
 Taffy (2023–present)
 Total Drama Presents: The Ridonculous Race (2022–present) (iPlayer only)
 Wallace and Gromit (1989–present)
 We Bare Bears (2020-present)

Upcoming programming

Animation
 Girls of Olympus
 Total Drama Island (revival)
 Total DramaRama

Former programming

@
 @the Edge

1–10

 12 Again
 The 13 Ghosts of Scooby-Doo
 2 Stupid Dogs
 3rd & Bird (1 July 2008)
 4 O'Clock Files (15 December 2014)
 50/50 (7 April 1997, 12 July 2005)
 64 Zoo Lane (3 April 2000)
 The 8:15 from Manchester (15 September 1990)

A

 Abadas
 Ace Lightning
 Ace Ventura: Pet Detective
 Activ8
 The Addams Family (1964 TV series)
 The Addams Family (1973 animated series)
 The Addams Family (1992 animated series)
 Adventure Florida
 The Adventure Game
 Adventures from the Book of Virtues 
 The Adventures of Abney & Teal
 The Adventures of Blinky Bill
 The Adventures of the Garden Fairies
 The Adventures of Parsley
 The Adventures of Raggedy Ann and Andy
 The Adventures of Robinson Crusoe
 The Adventures of Shirley Holmes
 The Adventures of Sir Prancelot
 The Adventures of Skippy
 The Adventures of Tintin
 Aesop's Tales
 Against All Odds
 Agent Z and the Penguin from Mars
 Albert the Fifth Musketeer
 Alesha's Street Dance Stars
 Alfonso Bonzo
 Ali-A's Superchargers
 Alienators: Evolution Continues
 Aliens in the Family
 The All-New Pink Panther Show
 The All-New Popeye Show
 All at Sea
 All or Nothing
 All Over the Place
 All Over the Workplace
 All Your Own
 The All-New Pink Panther Show
 The All-New Popeye Show
 Alphabet Attack
 Alphablocks
 Alvin and the Chipmunks
 The Amazing Adventures of Morph
 The Amazing Chan and the Chan Clan
 Andy Pandy
 Andy's Baby Animals
 Andy's Dinosaur Adventures
 Andy's Dino Toybox
 Andy's Prehistoric Adventures
 Andy's Safari Adventures
 Andy's Secret Hideout
 Andy's Wild Adventures
 Andy's Wild Workouts
 Angelmouse
 Angus and Cheryl
 Animal Arc
 Animal Fair (TV series)
 Animal Magic
 The Animal Magic Show
 Animal World
 Animaland
 Animalia
 Animals at Work
 The Animals of Farthing Wood
 Animorphs
 Anthony Ant
 The Antics Road Show
 Anytime Tales
 Ape Man: Adventures in Human Evolution
 Apple Tree House
 Aquila
 Archer's Goon
 Arizona (TV series)
 Around the World with Willy Fog
 Art Ninja
 Astro Boy
 AstroKids
 Atlantis High
 Attack of the Killer Tomatoes: The Animated Series

B

 Babar 
 The Baby Club
 Baby Jake
 Back to the Future
 Backshall's Deadly Adventures
 Bad Boyes
 Bad Penny
 Badger Girl
 Badjelly the Witch
 Baggy Pants and the Nitwits
 Bagpuss
 Bailey Kipper's P.O.V.
 Bailey's Comets
 The Baker Street Boys
 Balamory
 Bamzooki
 The Banana Splits
 Bananaman (1983-1986, 1989-1997)
 Barbapapa (1975-1978)
 Barmy Aunt Boomerang
 Barnaby the Bear
 Barney
 Barney Bear
 Barney's Barrier Reef
 Barney's Latin America
 The Bartons
 The Basil Brush Show
 Basil's Game Show
 Basil's Swap Shop
 Batfink
 Battle of the Planets
 The Batman
 Batty Adventures
 Bay City
 BB3B
 Bear Behaving Badly
 A Bear Behind
 Beat the Boss
 Beat the Teacher
 Beau Geste
 Becky and Barnaby Bear
 Bedtime Stories
 Belfry Witches
 Bernard
 Bertha
 Bellamy's Backyard Safari
 Belle and Sebastian
 Belle and Sebastian
 The Bellflower Bunnies
 Benji, Zax & the Alien Prince
 Best of Friends
 Betty Boop
 Between the Lions
 Beyond Bionic 
 Big & Small
 Big Babies
 Big Barn Farm
 Big City Park
 Big Cook, Little Cook
 Big Kids
 The Big Knights
 Biggleton
 The Big Performance
 Big Wolf on Campus
 Bill and Ben
 Billy Bean and His Funny Machine
 Billy Bunter of Greyfriars School
 Billy Webb's Amazing Stories
 Bing
 Binka
 The Biskitts
 Bits and Bobs
 Bitsa
 Bitz & Bob
 The Biz
 Bizzy Lizzy
 Blackhearts in Battersea
 Bleep and Booster
 Blood and Honey (TV series)
 Blow Your Mind (TV series)
 Blue Peter
 Bluebirds
 Bluey
 The Bluffers
 Bobobobs
 Bob the Builder
 Bobinogs
 Bod
 Bodger & Badger
 Boj
 Boo!
 Boogie Beebies
 The Bookworms
 The Boot Street Band
 Bootleg
 The Borrowers
 Bosco
 B.O.T. and the Beasties
 The Bots Master
 Bottersnikes and Gumbles
 The Box of Delights
 The Brady Kids
 Brain Freeze (TV series)
 Brain-Jitsu
 Brambly Hedge
 BraveStarr
 Break In The Sun
 Break Point
 Bric-a-Brac
 Bright Sparks
 Bring It On (TV series)
 The Brollys
 Brum
 Bruno the Kid
 Bucky O'Hare and the Toad Wars
 Buddy
 Bump
 Bump in the Night
 Bunyip
 The Busy World of Richard Scarry
 But First This
 Butterfly Island
 Byker Grove

C

 C Bear and Jamal
 The C.B. Bears
 Calimero
 Camberwick Green
 Captain Abercromby
 Captain Caveman and the Teen Angels
 Captain Pugwash
 Captain Scarlet and the Mysterons
 Captain Zep – Space Detective
 Carrie and David's Popshop
 Carrie's War
 Cartoon Critters
 Casper
 Casper Classics
 Caterpillar Trail
 Catie's Amazing Machines
 Cats Eyes
 Cavegirl
 CB Bears
 Celebrity Driving Academy
 Century Falls
 ChalkZone
 Champion the Wonder Horse
 The Changes
 Charlie and Lola
 The Charlie Brown and Snoopy Show (1986-2021)
 Charlie Chalk
 Cheggers Plays Pop
 Chegwin Checks It Out
 CBBC @ R1's Teen Awards
 CBBC does Fame Academy
 CBBC Official Chart Show
 CBBC Visits the Wizarding World of Harry Potter and Fantastic Beasts
 CBeebies Bedtime Stories
 Chigley
 Children of Fire Mountain
 The Children of Green Knowe
 The Chinese Puzzle
 Chip 'n' Dale
 Chipmunks Go to the Movies
 Chock-A-Block
 Christopher Crocodile
 The Chronicles of Narnia
 Chuck Finn
 The ChuckleHounds
 ChuckleVision
 Chucklewood Critters
 Chuggington
 Chute!
 CINEMANIACS
 Clangers
 Clarissa Explains It All
 Class
 Class Dismissed
 Clifford the Big Red Dog
 Clifford's Puppy Days
 Clockwise (TV series)
 Cloudbabies
 Clowning Around
 Clutter Nutters
 Codename Icarus
 Colour in the Creek
 Come Outside
 Comic Relief Does Glee Club
 Conan the Adventurer
 Connie the Cow
 Cop School
 Copycats
 Corners
 The Country Boy (TV series)
 Crackerjack
 The Cramp Twins
 Creeped Out (TV series)
 Crisis Control
 Crocadoo
 Crush (BBC TV series)
 The Crust
 Crystal Tipps and Alistair
 Cubix
 Cuckoo Land
 Cupidon Mouse

D

 Da Dick and Dom Dairies
 Danger Mouse
 Dance Factory
 Dani's Castle
 Dani's House
 The Dare Devil
 Dark Season
 Dark Towers
 Dastardly and Muttley in Their Flying Machines
 Dead Entry
 Dead Gorgeous
 Dear Heart
 Dear Mr Barker
 Deadly 360
 Deadly 60
 Deadly 60 on a Mission
 Deadly Art
 Deadly Top 10s
 The December Rose
 The Deep
 Defenders of the Earth
 Degrassi Junior High
 The Demon Headmaster
 The Dengineers
 Dennis and Gnasher 
 Dennis the Menace and Gnasher
 Deputy Dawg
 Desperados
 Dick & Dom in da Bungalow
 Dick and Dom's Funny Business
 Dick and Dom's Hoopla
 Dick 'N' Dom Go Wild
 Diddy Dick and Dom
 Diddy Movies
 Diddy TV
 Dilly the Dinosaur
 Dink, the Little Dinosaur
 Dinky Dog
 Dinky Duck
 Dino Babies
 Dinopaws
 Dinosapien
 Dinosaur Detectives
 Dipdap
 Dirtgirlworld
 Disaster Chef
 Dizzy Heights
 DNN: Definitely Not Newsround
 Do Something Different
 Do You Know?
 Doctor Dolittle
 Dodgem
 Doctor Who: Dreamland
 Doctor Who: The Infinite Quest
 The Dog Ate My Homework
 Dog Loves Books
 Dogstar
 Dogtanian and the Three Muskehounds
 Don and Pete
 Donald Duck
 Dooby Duck's Disco Bus
 Dooby Duck's Euro Tour
 Dooby's Duck Truck
 Doodle Do
 Double Dare
 Down on the Farm
 DreamWorks Dragons
 Dr Otter
 Drak Pack
 Driver Dan's Story Train
 Droopy
 Droopy, Master Detective
 Dudley Do-Right
 The Dumping Ground
 The Dumping Ground Survival Files
 Duncan Dares
 Dungeons & Dragons
 Dustbin Baby
 DynaMo

E

 Earthfasts
 Ed, Edd n Eddy
 Ed and Oucho's Excellent Inventions
 The Ed and Zed Show
 Eek! The Cat
 Eggs 'n' Baker
 El Nombre
 Erky Perky
 Election
 The Electric Company
 Elidor
 Eliot Kid
 Emu's Broadcasting Company
 Endangered Species
 Enid Blyton's Enchanted Lands
 Ernie's Incredible Illucinations
 Escape from Jupiter
 Escape from Scorpion Island
 Ethelbert the Tiger
 Eureka
 Eureka TV
 Evacuation
 Eve
 Even Stevens
 Ever After High
 Everything's Rosie
 Expo (TV series)
 The Eye of the Dragon

F

 Fab Lab
 Fame Academy
 The Fame Game
 The Family-Ness
 Fantastic Max
 Fantastic Four
 The Fairly OddParents (2003-2009)
 Fast Forward (UK TV series)
 Favorite Songs
 Fear Falls
 Feather Boy
 Fee Fi Fo Yum
 Feeling Better
 Fergus McPhail
 Ferne and Rory's Teeny Tiny Creatures
 Ferne and Rory's Vet Tales
 Fetch! with Ruff Ruffman
 Fiddley Foodle Bird
 Fievel's American Tails
 Fimbles
 Fingerbobs
 Fingermouse
 Finley the Fire Engine
 Fireman Sam 
 Fit
 Five Children and It
 Fix & Foxi and Friends
 Flash Gordon
 The Flashing Blade
 Flint the Time Detective
 The Flintstone Kids
 The Flintstone Comedy Hour
 The Flintstone Comedy Show
 The Flintstones
 The Flumps
 Fly-High and Huggy
 Fly Tales
 Footy Pups
 The Fonz and the Happy Days Gang
 For the Children
 Forget Me Not Farm
 Fox Tales
 Frankenstein's Cat
 Fred Basset
 Fred and Barney Meet the Shmoo
 Free Willy
 Freefonix
 Friday Download
 Friday Film Special
 Friends and Heroes
 Fudge
 Fully Booked
 Fungus the Bogeyman
 Funky Fables
 The Funky Phantom
 Funnybones
 The Furchester Hotel
 The Further Adventures of SuperTed

G

 Gadget Boy
 Galaxy Goof-Ups
 Galidor: Defenders of the Outer Dimension
 Galloping Galaxies!
 Garden Tales
 Garth and Bev
 Gastronauts
 The Genie From Down Under
 Gentle Ben
 Geronimo Stilton
 Get 100
 Get Squiggling
 Get Set
 Get Well Soon
 Get Your Own Back
 The Ghost Hunter
 Ghostwriter
 The Gift
 Gigglebiz
 Gigglequiz
 Gimme A Break
 Gina's Laughing Gear
 The Girl from Tomorrow
 The Girl from Tomorrow Part II: Tomorrow's End
 Glad Rags
 Go Jetters
 Go with Noakes
 The Godzilla Power Hour
 Godzilla: The Series
 Going Live
 Goober and the Ghost Chasers
 Goodbye Year 6
 Goofy
 Goosebumps
 Gordon the Garden Gnome
 Gordon the Gopher
 Grace's Amazing Machines
 Gran
 Grandad
 Grandpa in My Pocket
 Grange Hill
 Gravedale High
 The Great Grape Ape Show
 The Greedysaurus Gang
 Green Balloon Club
 Greenclaws
 Gruey
 Guess with Jess
 Gundrun: The Viking Princess
 Gym Stars

H

 Hacker Time
 Hacker's Birthday Bash: 30 Years of Children's BBC
 Hacker's CBBC Christmas Carol
 Hacker's CBBC Top 10
 Hacker's Crackers
 Hacker's Olympic Rundown
 Hai! Karate – Journey to Japan
 Hairy Jeremy
 Half Moon Investigations
 The Hallo Spencer Show
 Hangar 17
 Hank Zipzer
 Happy Families
 Happy Tent Tales
 Hardball
 Hartbeat
 Hard Spell Abbey
 Harlem Globetrotters
 Harriet's Army
 Harry and the Hendersons
 Harry and Toto
 Hattytown Tales
 Heads and Tails
 Heathcliff
 Heathcliff and the Catillac Cats
 Hector Heathcote
 Hector's House
 Hedz
 Help! My Supply Teacher's Magic
 Help! Teach is Coming to Stay
 Help!... It's the Hair Bear Bunch!
 Henry's Cat
 The Herbs
 Here Come the Double Deckers
 Hero Squad
 Hero to Zero
 Hetty Feather
 Hey Duggee
 Heyyy, It's the King!
 Hider in the House
 Higgledy House
 Highlander: The Animated Series
 Histeria!
 Hit The Stage
 Hokey Cokey
 Hokey Wolf
 The Hollies School
 Hollywood 7
 Holly Hobbie
 Home Farm Twins
 Hong Kong Phooey
 Horrible Histories (2009 TV series)
 Horrible Histories (2015 TV series)
 Horrible Histories: Gory Games
 Horses Galore
 Hotch Potch House
 Hotel Trubble
 Hounded
 The House Of Gristle
 How To Be Epic @ Everything
 Hububb
 Huckleberry Finn and His Friends
 Hushabye Lullabye
 Hunter's Gold

I

 I Can Cook
 I Can Dream
 I Dare You
 I Dream
 I Hate This House
 I Love Mummy
 I Want My Own Room
 I Was a Rat
 Ice Stars
 Iconicles
 The Impossibles
 Inspector Gadget
 In the Night Garden...
 Inch High, Private Eye
 Incredible Games
 The Incredible Hulk (1982 series)
 The Incredible Hulk (1996 series)
 The Infinite Quest
 Ingenious
 Inside Life
 Insides Out
 Intergalactic Kitchen
 Ipso Facto
 Iron Man
 It'll Never Work
 Itsy Bitsy Spider
 Ivor the Engine
 Iznogoud

J

 Jackanory
 Jackie Chan Adventures
 Jakers! The Adventures of Piggley Winks 
 Jamie Johnson
 Jamillah and Aladdin
 Jana of the Jungle
 Janosch's Story Time
 Jedward's Big Adventure
 Jeopardy
 Jeremiah in the Dark Woods
 The Jetsons
 Jigsaw
 Jim Henson's Animal Show
 Jimbo and the Jet-Set
 Jinx
 Jockey School
 Joe
 Joe 90
 Joe All Alone 
 Johnny and the Bomb
 The Johnny and Inel Show
 Johnson and Friends (1991-1999)
 JoJo & Gran Gran
 The Joke Machine
 Jollywobbles!
 Jonny Briggs
 Jonny Quest
 Joshua Jones
 Josie and the Pussycats
 Josie and the Pussycats in Outer Space
 Jossy's Giants
 The Journey of Allen Strange
 The Juggler
 Julia Jekyll and Harriet Hyde
 The Jungle Book
 Junior Bake Off
 Junior MasterChef
 Junior Vets
 Junior Vets on Call
 Juniper Jungle
 Junk Rescue
 Just So Stories
 Just William (1994 TV series)
 Just William (2010 TV series)
 Justin's House
 Just Kidding

K

 Kate and Mim Mim
 Katie Morag
 Katy 
 Kazoops!
 Keep Your Enemies Close
 Keith Harris and Orville
 Kenan & Kel
 Kerching!
 Kerwhizz
 Kevin and Co.
 Kevin's Cousins
 Kick Start
 Kickabout+
 Kid BubbleGum Goes Around The Globe
 The Kids from 47A 
 The Kids of Degrassi Street
 King Cinder
 King Greenfingers
 King Rollo
 Kiri and Lou
 Kissyfur
 Kit & Pup
 Kizzy
 Knock, Knock
 Knowhow
 The Koala Brothers
 The Krankies Elektronik Komik
 The Kwicky Koala Show
 Krypto the Superdog

L

 L.A. 7
 Laff-A-Lympics
 Lagging
 The Lampies
 The Large Family
 Lassie
 Lassie's Rescue Rangers
 Last Commanders
 Laurel and Hardy
 Lay on Five
 LazyTown* (S1-2 Only)
 League of Super Evil
 Learning With The Pooyoos
 The Legend of Dick and Dom
 Legend of the Dragon
 The Legend of Prince Valiant
 The Legend of Tim Tyler
 Leon
 Leonardo
 Let's Celebrate
 Let's Go for a Walk!
 The Let's Go Club
 Let's Play
 Legend Quest
 Level Up
 Lifebabble
 Lift Music
 Lift Off! With Coppers and Co!
 The Likeaballs
 A Likely Lad
 Lilly the Witch
 The Lingo Show
 Lippy the Lion & Hardy Har Har
 The Lion, The Witch and The Wardrobe
 The Littl' Bits
 Little Bear
 Little Big Awesome
 Little Big Cat
 Little Charley Bear
 Little Howard's Big Question
 Little Human Planet
 Little Miss (1983-1988)
 Little Monsters
 Little Mouse on the Prairie
 The Little Polar Bear
 Little Red Tractor
 Little Robots
 Little Roy
 Little Shop
 Little Sir Nicholas
 Little Tournament Over Yonder Adventures
 The Little Vampire
 The Littlest Hobo
 Littlest Pet Shop
 Live & Kicking
 Lizzie Dripping
 Lizzie McGuire
 Lockie Leonard
 A Long Long Crime Ago
 Look and Read
 Looney Tunes
 Lost & Found Music Studios
 Love Monster
 The Lowdown
 Ludus
 Ludwig
 Lulu Zipadoo
 Luna
 Lunar Jim

M

 M.I. High
 The Machine Gunners
 Maddigan's Quest
 Maggie
 Magic Door
 Magic Grandad
 Magic Hands
 The Magic Key
 The Magic Roundabout
 The Magical Adventures of Quasimodo
 The Make Shift
 Maid Marian and Her Merry Men
 Mama Mirabelle's Home Movies
 Marine Boy
 Marlene Marlowe Investigates
 Marrying Mum and Dad
 Martha Speaks
 Martin's Mice
 The Marvel Action Hour
 Mary, Mungo and Midge (1969-1978)
 The Mask: Animated Series
 The Master of Ballantrae
 Match of the Day Kickabout
 Matilda and the Ramsay Bunch
 Maya & Miguel
 McGee and Me!
 Me and My Monsters
 Me Too!
 Meet the Pups
 Meet the Kittens
 Melody
 Melvin and Maureen's Music-a-grams
 Merlin
 Merrie Melodies
 Messy Goes to Okido
 MetalHeads
 Miami 7
 Mick and Mac
 Mickey and Donald
 Mickey Mouse
 Microscopic Milton
 Microsoap
 Midnight Patrol: Adventures in the Dream Zone
 Mighty Max
 Mighty Mites
 Mighty Mouse
 Mighty Mouse: The New Adventures
 Mighty Truck of Stuff
 Mike the Knight
 Mike, Mop and the Moke
 Millie Inbetween
 Minibeast Adventure with Jess
 The Minimighty Kids
 The Minimighty Squad
 The Ministry of Curious Stuff
 The Mini Show(S1 & S2 Only)
 Minuscule
 Mio Mao
 Misery Guts
 Mission: 2110
 Mister Maker
 Misterjaw
 Model Millie
 The Mole
 Molly and Mack
 Mona the Vampire
 Monster Café
 Monster High
 Monster Rancher
 Monster TV 
 Monty & Co
 Monty the Dog
 Moomin
 Moon and Me
 The Moon Stallion
 Moondial
 Mop and Smiff
 Morph
 The Morph Files
 Morris Minor's Marvellous Motors
 Mortified
 Mortimer and Arabel
 Mother Goose and Grimm
 Mouse and Mole
 The Movie Game
 Mr Benn
 Mr. Bloom: Here and There
 Mr. Bloom's Nursery
 Mr. Magoo
 Mr. Men (1974-1988)
 Mr. Wymi
 Mud
 Muddle Earth
 Muffin the Mule
 Multi-Coloured Swap Shop
 The Mummy: The Animated Series
 The Munsters
 Muppet Babies
 My Almost Famous Family
 My First
 My Friend Walter
 My Genius Idea
 My Life
 My Mum Tracy Beaker (2021)
 My Perfect Landing
 My Pet and Me
 My Petsaurus
 My Story
 My Team: The Cheerleaders
 My World Kitchen
 MySay
 The Mysterious Cities of Gold
 The Mysti Show
 Mythical Magical Creatures
 Mystic
 MyWish

N

 Naomi's Nightmares of Nature
 Nelly and Nora
 Nelly Nut: Live
 The New Adventures of Black Beauty
 The New Adventures of Flash Gordon
 The New Adventures of Mighty Mouse
 The New Adventures of Sally The CowGirl
 The New Adventures of Speed Racer
 The New Adventures of Superman'''
 The New Adventures of Winnie the Pooh The New Adventures of Zorro The New Fred and Barney Show The New Lassie The New Scooby-Doo Movies The New Shmoo The New Woody Woodpecker Show The New Yogi Bear Show Newsround Newsround Showbiz Newsround Specials The Next Big Thing The Next Step Nick Cope's Popcast Night of the Red Hunter Nilus the Sandman Nina and the Neurons Ninja Turtles: The Next Mutation No Sweat Noah and Nelly in... SkylArk Noah and Saskia Noah's Island The Noddy Shop Noddy's Toyland Adventures Noggin the Nog Nowhere Boys Now You See It Number 74 Numberblocks Numberjacks Numbertime The Numtums Nutty McGils Nuzzle and ScratchO

 Oakie Doke Ocean Odyssey Ocean Star The Octonauts Odd Squad Officially Amazing Officially Amazing Extra Officially Amazing Mini Old Jack's Boat Old Jack's Boat: Rockpool Tales Olobob Top One Minute Wonders Only in America OOglies Open A Door Ouch!  again.
 Opposites Attract Orville and Cuddles Oscar Charlie Oscar's Orchestra Osker and the Ice-Pick Oti's Boogie Beebies Oucho The Cactus Our Family Our Planet Our School' Out of Tune Out There Outback 8 Over the Moon with Mr. Boom Ovide and the Gang The OwlP

 Pablo Pablo the Little Red Fox Paddington Paradise Café Parallax Parallel 9 Patchwork Pals Patrick's Planet Patrik Pacard Paw Paws (8 April 1988, 6 November 1990)
 PC Pinkerton The Pebbles and Bamm-Bamm Show Pedro and Frankensheep Penelope K, by the way Penny Crayon The Perishers The Perils of Penelope Pitstop (20 October 1970, 15 December 1997)
 Peter Pan & the Pirates (14 September 1992, 23 December 1999)
 Peter Rabbit Pet School Pet Squad The Pets Factor Phantom 2040 Philbert Frog Philomena The Phoenix and the Carpet Picture Book Pie in the Sky Pig Heart Boy Pigeon Street Pingu Pink Panther and Sons The Pink Panther Show Pinky and the Brain (31 October 2005, 30 December 2007)
 Pinky and Perky The Pinky and Perky Show Pinky Dinky Doo Pinny's House Pinocchio Pinocchio & Friends (30 May 2022)
 Pirates The Pirates of Dark Water (7 April 1992, 30 August 1997)
 Pitt & Kantrop Pixelface Pixie and Dixie (2 August 1971, 3 December 1982)
 Planet Ajay Planet Cook Planet Dinosaur Files Plasmo Play Away Play School Playdays The Playlist Pluto Pocket Dragon Adventures (4 January 1999)
 Pocket Money Pitch The POD The Poddington Peas Poetry Pie The Pogles Pole Position Police Academy Polka Dot Shorts Poochini's Yard Pop Slam! The Pop Zone Popeye Popeye and Son (9 October 1988, 16 December 2004)
 Postman Pat Postman Pat Special Delivery Service Potsworth & Co. (2 January 1991, 24 June 2002)
 Powers Prank Patrol Prank Patrol Down Under The Prince and the Pauper The Prince of Atlantis Prudence Kitten A Pup Named Scooby-Doo The Puppy's Further Adventures (7 April 1986, 14 December 2001)
 Puppydog Tales Puzzle TrailQ

 Q Pootle 5 (29 July 2013)
 The Quack Chat Show (16 February 1989, 10 June 1991)
 The Queen's Nose Quick Draw McGraw (24 December 1990, 24 August 1993)

R

 Raa Raa the Noisy Lion (9 May 2011)
 The Raccoons (4 March 1987, 13 December 2002)
 The Raccoons and the Lost Star (26 December 1983, 1 January 1992)
 The Raccoons on Ice (25 December 1982, 1 January 1993)
 The Racing Set Radio Roo Radio Studio Compise Rag, Tag and Bobtail Ragtime Rank the Prank Rastamouse (31 January 2011)
 Raven Raven: The Dragon's Eye Raven: The Island Raven: The Secret Temple Razzledazzle (14 February 2005)
 The Real Adventures of Jonny Quest The Really Wild Show Record Breakers The Red Hand Gang Relic: Guardians Of The Museum Remotely Funny Rentaghost The Return of the Psammead Return to Jupiter The Revenge Files of Alistair Fury Rewind The Rhyme Rocket Richard Hammond's Blast Lab Richie Rich Rimba's Island Roald Dahl's Revolting Recipes Roar Robinson Sucroe Rocket Boy and Toro Rocket's Island The Rocky and Bullwinkle Show Roger and Co Roland and Rattfink Roland Rat Rolf Harris Cartoon Time The Roly Mo Show The Roman Holidays Roman Mysteries Romuald the Reindeer Roobarb Roswell Conspiracies Rotten Ralph Round the Twist Roy The Roy Files Rubbadubbers A Rubovian Legend Rude Dog and the Dweebs Ruff-Ruff, Tweet and Dave Rugrats Rule The School Run the Risk Running Scared Rupert BearS

 S Club 7 Go Wild! S Club Juniors Summer Party S Club Search Saban's Adventures of Pinocchio Sadie J Salty Sam & Mark's Big Friday Wind-Up Sam and Mark's Guide to Dodging Disaster Sam and Mark's Sports Showdown Sam and the River Sam on Boffs' Island Same Smile Sarah & Duck The Sarah Jane Adventures Sarah Jane's Alien Files The Satellite Show Saturday Aardvark Saturday Mash-Up! The Saturday Picture Show Saturday Starts Here Saturday Superstore School For Stars School of Roars School of Silence Scooby-Doo and Scrappy-Doo Scooby-Doo! Mystery Incorporated The Scooby-Doo Show Scooby-Doo, Where Are You! Scoop Score with the Scaffold Screen Test Seaview Secret Life of Boys Secret Life of Toys The Secret Show The Secret Saturdays Secret Squirrel Scream Street Secret World See How They Run See It Saw It Sergeant Stripes Serious Amazon Serious Andes Serious Arctic Serious Desert Serious Jungle Serious Ocean Seriously Raleigh 
 Sesame Tree Seven Little Australians Shakespeare: The Animated Tales The Shari Lewis Show Sheeep She-Ra and the Princesses of Power The Shiny Show Ship to Shore Shoebox Zoo Short Change Show and Spell Show Me What You're Made Of Sick as a Parrot Sidekick The Silver Brumby Silver Surfer Simon and the Witch The Singing Kettle Six Classic Fairy Tales Skate Nation Skeleton Warriors Sketchy Comedy Skip and Fuffy Skippy the Bush Kangaroo Skunk Fu! The Slammer Small Potatoes Smalltalk Diaries SMart Smart Guy SMarteenies Smile The Smoggies The Smokehouse The Smurfs (14 June 1982, 26 March 1995)
 Snailsbury Tales Snap! Snorks So Awkward So Little Time So You Want to be Top? The Sorcerer's Apprentice Sorry, I've Got No Head Space Ark Space Pirates Space Sentinels SpaceVets The Sparticle Mystery Speed Buggy Speed Racer Spider Spider Riders Spider-Man (1981 TV series)
 Spider-Man (1994 TV series)
 Spider-Man and His Amazing Friends Spirit Warriors Splatalot! Spook Squad Spook Up! The Spooktacular New Adventures of Casper Sport Relief Does Glee Club Sportsround Spot Bots Spot the Dog Spot's Musical Adventures Spy Trap Spywatch Square One Television The Stables Stacey Stone Star Trek: The Animated Series Star Wars: Droids Star Wars: Ewoks Starhill Ponies Steel Riders Step Inside Stepping Up Stig of the Dump Stilgoe's On Stingray Stitch Up! Stone Protectors Stoppit and Tidyup The Story Makers The Story of the Treasure Seekers Storytime The Strange Affair of Adelaide Harris Strange Hill High Street Monsters Stuart Little: The Animated Series Student Bodies Studio E Stupid! Sub Zero Summerhill Summerton Mill The Sunday Gang Super Duper Sumos Super Human Challenge Super Junior and Super Tank Show Super Rupert Superbods Superman: The Animated Series SuperTed Suspect Swamp Thing Swashbuckle SWAT Kats: The Radical Squadron Sweet Seventeen Sweet Valley High System 93T

 T. and T. T.T.V. Take a Bow Take Hart Take That Take Two Taking the Next Step (13 June 2016)
 The Tale of Jack Frost (25 December 2004, 31 December 2009)
 Tales from Europe Tales of Aesop Tales of the Riverbank Tales of the Tooth Fairies (7 September 1993, 14 December 1993)
 Tales of a Wise King Tarzan, Lord of the Jungle (1 January 1977)
 Taz-Mania (21 December 1998)
 Tea with Grandma (14 September 1992, 9 November 1992)
 Teacup Travels (9 February 2015, 13 January 2017)
 Technobabble Ted Sieger's Wildlife Teddles Teddy Edward (5 January 1973, 30 March 1973)
 Teddy Trucks (4 January 1994, 7 April 1994)
 TeddyBears Tee & Mo Teenage Mutant Hero Turtles (3 January 1990) 
 TeleQuest (26 July 1999, 13 August 1999)
 Telescope Teletubbies (31 March 1997)
 Telling Tales Tellytales (9 March 2009)
 The Terrible Thunderlizards (20 August 1997, 12 December 1998)
 Testament: The Bible in Animation Theodore There's a Viking in My Bed These Are the Days Think of a Number This is Daniel Cook This is Emily Yeung Three Delivery Thumb Wrestling Federation(8 September 2007)
 ThunderCats (2 January 1987)
 Tik Tak Tikkabilla (14 October 2002, 27 January 2007)
 Time Busters Time for School Time Warp Trio (27 July 2007)
 Timeless Tales Timeless Tales from Hallmark Timmy Time (6 April 2009, 13 July 2012)
 Tinga Tinga Tales (1 February 2010, 31 March 2011)
 Tinpo Tiny and Mr Duck's Huge Show Tiny Tumble TMi (16 September 2006, 17 December 2010)
 To Me, To You! ToddWorld Tolibob Tom and Jerry (4 April 1967)
 Tom & Jerry Kids (28 April 1998)
 Tom Tom Tommy Zoom Tom's Midnight Garden Toonatics Top Cat (16 May 1962, 1989)
 Top Class Top of the Form Top of the Pops Reloaded Topsy and Tim (11 November 2013)
 The Torch Totally Doctor Who (13 April 2006, 29 June 2007)
 Totally Rubbish Tottie: The Story of a Doll's House (7 February 1984, 30 December 1991)
 Tots TV (19 April 2004)
 Touché Turtle and Dum Dum (18 January 1978, 31 December 1979)
 Towser Toxic Crusaders (2 May 1992, 11 January 1995)
 Tracy Beaker Returns Tracy Beaker Survival Files Trading Places Transmission Impossible with Ed and Oucho Travel Bug A Traveller in Time Trapped! Treasure Treasure Champs Tree Fu Tom (5 March 2012, 3 October 2016)
 Tricks 'n' Tracks (9 April 1992, 29 September 1994)
 Tricky Business The Tripods (15 September 1984, 23 November 1985)
 Trollz (3 October 2005, 23 August 2008)
 Tronji (11 May 2009)
 Troublemakers The True Meaning of Crumbfest True Tilda (16 March 1997, 20 April 1997)
 Trumpton (3 January 1967, 28 March 1967)
 Tucker's Luck (10 March 1983, 17 December 1985)
 Tweenies (6 September 1999, 25 July 2002)
 Twin It to Win It (25 July 2016)
 The Twisted Whiskers Show (26 September 2009)
 Twirlywoos (23 February 2015)

U

 UGetMe UK Top 40 
 Uki UKool Ultimate Book of Spells Ultimate Brain Ultimate Sports Day Ultimate Vets Ulysses 31 (7 November 1985, 22 July 1987)
 Uncle Jack Uncle Max Undercover Dads! Undercover Elephant (23 July 1980, 7 May 1982)
 The Underdog Show (20 March 2007, 30 July 2007)
 Underground Ernie Up on Our StreetV

 Val Meets The VIPs 
 Valley of the Dinosaurs (4 February 1975, 5 February 1977)
 Victor & Maria 
 Vision On 
 Visionaries: Knights of the Magical Light (11 March 1989, 31 December 1989)
 Viva S Club Vote For Me 
 The Voyages of Doctor DolittleW

 Wacky Races Waffle the Wonder Dog Wait For It...! Walk on the Wild Side Walking the Dog Wallace and Gromit's World of Invention Wally Gator Watch The Watch House Watch My Chops Watch with Mother Waterfalls Watt on Earth The Way Things Work Waybuloo The Wayne Manifesto We Are the Champions What-A-Mess What? Where? When? Why? What's Inside? What's New, Scooby-Doo? What's on Your Head? Where in the World Whirligig White Peak Farm Whizz Whizz Whizz Bang Bang Who, Sir? Me, Sir? Who Let the Dogs Out? Who Wants To Be A Superhero? Whoops I Missed the Bus Whoops I Missed Newsround Why 5 Why Don't You? Wibbly Pig Wide-Eye Wiggly Park Wild Wild About Animals Wild and Weird The Wild House Wild Tales The Wild Thornberrys Wildbunch William's Wish Wellingtons Willo the Wisp Wingin' It Winsome Witch Wishbone Wishing W.I.T.C.H. The Wizard of Oz Wizards vs Aliens Wizbit Wolfblood Wolfblood Secrets Wolfblood Uncovered Wolverine and the X-Men The Wombles Wonderful World of Weird The Woodentops Woody Woodpecker Woolly and Tig Words and Pictures World of Happy The World of Peter Rabbit and Friends Worst Day of My Life The Worst Witch Worst Year of My Life Again Worzel Gummidge Turns Detective Wowser The WuzzlesX

 X-Men X-periMENTAL Xchange The X'sY

 Yakka Dee (13 November 2017)
 Yo! Diary 
 Yo Yogi! Yoho Ahoy Yoko! Jakamoko! Toto! Yolanda's Band Jam You and Me You Should Be So Lucky (19 February 1986, 11 February 1987)
 Young Dracula (21 September 2006)
 The Young Indiana Jones Chronicles (20 November 1994, 24 April 2005)
 Yvon of the Yukon (25 March 2002)

Z

 Zig and Zag Zigby Zingalong ZingZillas ZingZillas Zingbop Zokko! The Zeta Project Zombie Hotel The Zoo Zoo Factor Zoom BBC children's movie and special programmes 
 The First Snow of Winter The Boy In The Dress Gangsta Granny Billionaire Boy Mr Stink The Littlest Angel Santa's Special Delivery Second Star to the Left The Tangerine Bear The True Meaning of Crumbfest Tracy Beaker: The Movie of Me''

Notes

References

External links

 

British television-related lists
Lists of television series by network
Children's television programmes